Billy Aronson is an American playwright and writer, who originated the concept of the rock opera Rent, which was based on Puccini's opera La bohème.

Early life
He attended Lower Merion High School and Princeton University.

Rent and other plays
In 1988, as a playwright he wanted to create "a musical based on Puccini's La Bohème, in which the luscious splendor of Puccini's world would be replaced with the coarseness and noise of modern New York." Although in 1989 he began a collaboration with Jonathan Larson, he provided additional lyrics for Rent, and wrote almost all of the number, "Santa Fe".

In addition to Rent, he has written many one act plays such as Of Two Minds, Guilt, Night Rules, and In the Middle of the Night, which was performed as part of the Ensemble Studio Theatre's 2011 Marathon.

Other plays by Aronson include Light Years and The News.

He also helped create musicals such as No Dogs Allowed, and Flurry Tale with Rusty Magee. He has written for many popular children shows, such as Postcards from Buster, Codename: Kids Next Door, Wonder Pets!, The Upside Down Show, The Backyardigans,  Courage the Cowardly Dog, and co-created Peg + Cat along with Jennifer Oxley. He was also a writer on Beavis and Butthead.

Personal life
Aronson is Jewish. He currently lives in New York City with his wife Lisa Vogel (whom he married in 1990), and children Anna and Jake.

References

External links

American musical theatre lyricists
Living people
Year of birth missing (living people)
Princeton University alumni
Lower Merion High School alumni